Local elections were held in Oriental Mindoro on May 9, 2022, as part of the 2022 Philippine general election. Voters will select candidates for all local positions: a town mayor, vice mayor, and town councilors, as well as members of the Sangguniang Panlalawigan, a vice-governor, a governor, and representatives for the province's two congressional districts in the Philippine House of Representatives.

Results

Governor

Per City/Municipality

Vice Governor

Per City/Municipality

Congressional Districts

1st District

2nd District

Provincial Board

1st District 

|colspan=5 bgcolor=black|

2nd District 

|colspan=5 bgcolor=black|

City and Municipal Election

1st District

Baco

Calapan

Naujan

Pola

Puerto Galera

San Teodoro

Socorro

Victoria

2nd District

Bansud

Bongabong

Bulalacao

Gloria

Mansalay

Pinamalayan

Roxas

References 

2022 Philippine local elections
May 2022 events in the Philippines